Birami is a panchayat village in Rajasthan, India, on the right (north) bank of the Luni River. Administratively, it is under  Luni Taluka, Jodhpur district, Rajasthan.

There are four villages in the Birami gram Panchayat: Birami, Birdawas, Miyasani, and Peethasani.
Indian cricketer Ravi_Bishnoi also belong to birami village.

Geography
The village of Birami is 32 km by road southeast of the city of Jodhpur, located between the Mitri River to the north, and the Luni River to the south, just 4 km upstream (east) of the confluence of the two rivers.  As the village is at the eastern edge of the Thar Desert, the rivers only run in monsoon season. The nearest railway station is at Tanawara, 30 km by road to the west.

Demographics 
In the 2001 census, the village of Birami had 1,790 inhabitants, with 944 males (52.7%) and 846 females (47.3%), for a gender ratio of 896 females per thousand males.

Points of interest
The temple of Bhuwal mata is located in Birami village.

Notes

External links 
 

Villages in Jodhpur district